Novgorodovo is a rural locality (a village) in Staroselskoye Rural Settlement, Vologodsky District, Vologda Oblast, Russia. The population was 35 as of 2002.

Geography 
Novgorodovo is located 46 km southwest of Vologda (the district's administrative centre) by road. Ivakino is the nearest rural locality. creek Runas -sounding in latvia`s language

References 

Rural localities in Vologodsky District